FC Slavia Karlovy Vary is a football club located in Karlovy Vary, Czech Republic. The club currently plays in the Bohemian Football League, which is the third tier of the Czech football system.

Historical names
 1928 — SK Slavia Karlovy Vary
 2001 — SK BULDOCI Karlovy Vary-Dvory
 2007 — FC BULDOCI Karlovy Vary
 2009 — 1. FC Karlovy Vary a.s.
 2017 — FC Slavia Karlovy Vary

References

External links
  
 Team profile at iDNES.cz 

Football clubs in the Czech Republic
Association football clubs established in 1928
Sport in Karlovy Vary
1928 establishments in Czechoslovakia